The Afon Twrch is a river which rises in the Black Mountain in south Wales.  It forms the boundary between the counties of Brecknockshire (currently administered as part of the unitary authority of Powys) and Carmarthenshire and, downstream of Ystradowen, between Brecknockshire and Glamorgan (and unitary authorities of Powys and Neath Port Talbot).

Name
The name derives from Welsh afon / 'river' and twrch / 'boar'.  In common with other rivers sharing the same name, it is believed to refer to the burrowing or snouting action of the waters of the river.  The river has also been associated with the legend of Twrch Trwyth.

Geography
The headwaters arise on the southern slopes of Bannau Sir Gaer (Carmarthen Fans) and Fan Brycheiniog and are soon joined by the waters of the Twrch Fechan.  The river flows south-west and then south and finally south-east for about 14 km / 9 miles to its confluence with the River Tawe at Ystalyfera. Significant tributaries include the Nant Gwys and the Nant Llynfell.

Settlements on the lower section of the river include Ystradowen, Cwm-twrch-uchaf, Cwm-twrch-isaf and Gurnos.

A colliery was established at Henllys Vale (OS grid ref SN762137) from which tramroads ran down the valley to Cwm-twrch-isaf.  A tall brick chimney is the most impressive of the remains of several buildings associated with the former colliery.  A bank of limekilns is also located at this spot which can be reached by a half-hour walk along the recently improved line of the tramway or waggonway running upstream from Brynhenllys Bridge (OS grid ref SN 756125).

Parts of Cwm Twrch on its Carmarthenshire side are designated as an SSSI because they expose a good example of a boundary between strata.

References 

Rivers of the Brecon Beacons National Park
Rivers of Carmarthenshire
Rivers of Neath Port Talbot
Rivers of Powys